Atigre  is a village in Kolhapur district in the Indian state of Maharashtra, in western India.

Near Atigre is a small lake, "Shahu Talav", which has provided drinking and irrigation water for the village for many years.

In 1997, the population of Atigre was about 3000. Many of the people living in Atigre are employed as teachers.

Education
There are many schools in this village: the "Anganvadi" for the kindergarten, the "Vidya Mandir Atigre" for primary school for Marathi medium education and high school for Marathi medium people learning up to 10th std. Students can obtain an international-level education at Sanjay Ghodawat Institution.

Festivals

Tourism is an industry in the village. There is a statue of Bahubali and a well-known temple, the "Maruti" temple. During Sri Ram Navami, which generally occurs in the months of March and April, a large number of devotees celebrate the three-day "Yatra" Festival in memory of Rama. It occurs on the ninth day, or navami, beginning on the "no moon day" or Amavasya, and continuing during the time of the waxing moon, "Shukla Paksha".  Celebrations and festivities begin with prayer to the Surya Deva early in the morning. At midday a devotional service to him is performed with Bhakti and piety.  As part of their belief in Maruti, the people in the village eat only vegetarian food, and in particular the Marathi food "Puran Poli" is served at this festival.

References

Villages in Kolhapur district